Steaua or Steaua București may refer to:

 CSA Steaua București, a Romanian multi-sports club
 FC Steaua București, the football department of the club where two entities have used the name
 CSA Steaua București (football), founded in 2017
 Fotbal Club FCSB, who used this name between 1963 and 2017